United International Pictures (UIP) is a joint venture of Paramount Pictures and Universal Pictures that distributes their films outside the United States and Canada. UIP also had international distribution rights to certain Metro-Goldwyn-Mayer and United Artists films when MGM was part of the venture and also distributed Disney films in certain territories until 1987. In 2001, MGM left UIP, and signed a distribution deal with 20th Century Fox's overseas arm. The company formerly distributed DreamWorks Pictures releases internationally as well until 2005.

In 2002, 2007, and 2021, the 20 countries overseas reorganized their organizations, and Universal Pictures and Paramount Pictures decided to have independent distribution systems.

Overview

Cinema International Corporation (1970–1981) 
Paramount's early history with MCA dates back to the 1950s, when part of its talent pool worked for Paramount Pictures; Alfred Hitchcock was among the best known. In 1958, MCA purchased the pre-1950 Paramount sound feature film library. In 1962, MCA purchased Universal Studios. In 1966, Gulf+Western purchased Paramount.

In a cost-cutting move, in 1970, as a result of American antitrust laws, and due to declining movie-going audiences, both Paramount and Universal agreed to merge their international operations into a new company, Cinema International Corporation, registered in England and Wales. It even operated in Canada and the Caribbean until the late 70s, when those territories were considered part of the "domestic" North American market.

In 1973, Metro-Goldwyn-Mayer closed down its distribution offices and became a partner in CIC, which took over international distribution for MGM's films; however, United Artists took over the US, Canadian and Caribbean distribution for MGM's films that time. CIC also entered the home video market by forming CIC Video, which distributed Paramount and Universal titles on video worldwide. MGM however, had its own video unit, which later became a joint venture with CBS as MGM/CBS Home Video (later known as MGM/UA Home Video, which was later renamed to MGM Home Entertainment).

United International Pictures (1981–present) 
In 1981, MGM merged with United Artists, which had its own international distribution unit. CIC refused to let MGM drop out of the venture at the time, but let them merge UA's overseas arm into CIC, which led to the reorganization of the company as United International Pictures from November 1, 1981. MGM eventually left the venture in 2001, when it moved its international distribution to 20th Century Fox. The last MGM film to be released through UIP was Return to Me in 2000.

In 1986, Ted Turner purchased MGM/UA, but later resold the company except for its film library, which included the pre-May 1986 MGM film and television library and the pre-1950 Warner Bros. film library (which the latter was sold to Associated Artists Productions in 1956, and got acquired by United Artists in 1958). After that library was acquired by Turner, UIP (through MGM/UA) signed a deal to continue distributing the pre-May 1986 MGM and pre-1950 Warner Bros. film libraries for theatrical release.

CIC's name lived on in its video division, which became directly managed as a joint venture of Paramount Home Video and MCA Videocassette, Inc. (later MCA Home Video and MCA/Universal Home Video). CIC Video survived until 1999, when Universal purchased PolyGram Filmed Entertainment and reorganised its video division (which was a joint venture with what is now Sony Pictures Home Entertainment, and remains so to this day) under the Universal name, while Paramount took over full ownership of CIC Video and merged it under its own video division.

UIP also had a subscription television arm, UIP Pay TV, which distributed Paramount, MGM/UA, and Universal releases to pay TV broadcasters outside the United States, Canada, Puerto Rico and the Anglophone Caribbean. In 1986, Canal+ had inked an agreement with UIP Pay TV to handle up to eighty titles for the French television market. UIP Pay TV was broken up in 1997 after a 4-year investigation by the European Union, as it accused UIP as a cartel-like organisation. The pay TV rights for the films were eventually transferred to Paramount International Television (later renamed CBS Paramount International Television and currently known as Paramount Global Distribution Group; today, the Paramount films are distributed by Trifecta Entertainment & Media), Universal Worldwide Television (currently known as NBCUniversal International Television Distribution) and MGM Worldwide Television.

Buena Vista Pictures Distribution also had a theatrical distribution agreement with UIP since 1982 in which UIP distributed Disney and Touchstone films in Italy, Brazil, West Germany and Australia (through the UIP-Fox joint-venture in the latter country) until 1987, when Warner Bros. and Roadshow Distributors respectively took over theatrical distribution of Disney material in those territories.

In 1999, UIP nearly lost its connection with Universal Pictures when Universal acquired PolyGram Filmed Entertainment's international division and rebranded as Universal Pictures International. Only a small handful of films were released theatrically by Universal Pictures International until the release of Mickey Blue Eyes, when Universal opted to merge its international theatrical unit with UIP, and UIP becoming the exclusive theatrical distributor for Universal films, and took some of the planned films released by Universal Pictures International with them, namely The Green Mile and Angela's Ashes. The agreement came in after Universal opted to renew its agreement with UIP until 2006. MGM, meanwhile left UIP and moved its distribution to 20th Century Fox that year, in 1999. The deal, however, was extended up until 2010 due to the MGM's financial crisis in the same year.

2007 reorganisation and post-reorganisation 
As the international box office started to exceed the US box office, Paramount Pictures and Universal Pictures started discussions about the future of United International Pictures under Universal Pictures vice chairman Marc Shmuger and Paramount vice-chairman Rob Friedman. Shmuger completed them with Rob Moore, recently appointed Paramount Pictures president of worldwide marketing and distribution. The two firms agreed on the countries where UIP would continue operating and on a draft system to select countries where that company would take over UIP operations and the other would have to start up operations. Either may sub-distribute films in the other former UIP countries until 2009. Starting January 1, 2007, United International Pictures considerably reduced its international operations. At least 15 key countries are now directly managed separately by Universal, taking over operations in Austria, Belgium, Germany, Italy, Netherlands, Russia, South Korea, Spain and Switzerland, and Paramount, taking over operations in Australia, Brazil, France, Ireland, Mexico, New Zealand and the United Kingdom. In Russia, Central Partnership took over distribution rights of Paramount Pictures' titles since 2008. UIP was planned to continue in Japan, Korea, Argentina, Chile, Colombia, Denmark, Greece, Hungary, India, Malaysia, Norway, Panama, Peru, Poland, Singapore, South Africa, Sweden, Taiwan, Thailand and Turkey. Universal announced in November 2007 their withdrawal from UIP in South Korea to set up its own branch at the same time as the other UIP operation ceased; Paramount announced that in that country, CJ Entertainment would be the company's exclusive distributor. UIP president and chief operating officer Andrew Cripps was hired as the head of Paramount Pictures International. In its first year, Paramount Pictures International distributed films that made the 1 billion mark in July 2007, the fifth studio that year to do so.

Though their Japanese operations were initially planned to be kept intact, United International Pictures withdrew from the Japanese market in late 2007. As a result, Paramount Pictures started handling their Japanese distribution of their movies themselves until January 31, 2016, when they formed a distribution alliance with TOWA PICTURES Company, Ltd. for Japanese theatrical distribution of their films, starting with The Big Short on March 4, 2016. Universal Pictures Japan also formed distribution alliances with TOHO-TOWA Company, Ltd. for theatrical distribution and Geneon Entertainment (now NBCUniversal Entertainment Japan) for home entertainment distribution.

In the Philippines, United International Pictures films were distributed through Warner Bros. until 2000 (with the exception of Twister where Warner handled theatrical distribution by themselves), when distribution switched to Viva International Pictures. Solar Entertainment Corporation through its Solar Films subsidiary distributed UIP films from 2004 to 2014 and Sony Pictures Releasing International later distributed them from 2014 to 2020. Due to the COVID-19 pandemic causing its cinemas to shutting down, UIP withdrew from the local market, leading to a breakup of the company in the Philippines. In October 2021, it was announced that Universal Pictures International signed a distribution alliance with Warner Bros. for Philippine theatrical distribution of their films, starting with No Time to Die on December 15, 2021, following its success of the alliance for Home Entertainment distribution in North America, Belgium, Ireland, Italy, Luxembourg, the Netherlands, the UK, Austria, Germany, Switzerland and Japan, as well as the success of their theatrical distribution alliance in Australia while distribution of select Focus Features titles went through a local start-up distribution company, UPSTREAM. Paramount Pictures meanwhile, has renewed its distribution alliance with Sony Pictures for Philippine theatrical distribution of their films.

Similarly in early 2021, the Brazilian Administrative Council for Economic Defense authorized the Brazilian distribution arm of Warner Bros. Pictures to license Universal's releases in Brazil. The first film under the new licensing deal was Promising Young Woman, released in Brazil in May 2021.

In 2002, United International Pictures withdrew from the Finnish market. As a result, their releases in that country from that point onwards were handled by Buena Vista International Finland until 2006, when distribution passed on to national cinema operator Finnkino.

In 2003, UIP started distributing Sony Pictures films in Poland.

Past organisation 
The company was formerly based in London, United Kingdom, though their operations in that country have been taken over by Paramount Pictures. However, as of May 2022, they continue to directly distribute films in 15 countries, Argentina, Colombia, Denmark, Hungary, Malaysia, Norway, Panama, Peru, Poland, Singapore, South Africa, Sweden, Taiwan, Thailand, and Turkey. In addition, the company has distribution agreements with locally owned distribution companies in a further 47 countries. One such example is Bontonfilm in the Czech Republic, who previously distributed material from CIC & UIP in both the Czech and the Slovak markets.

In Denmark, UIP distributed films released by Mis. Label and in Turkey, UIP distributed select films released by Fida Film, TMC Film and Film Pop.

References

External links 
 

Film distributors of the United Kingdom
Film distributors of Spain
Film distributors of Poland
Film distributors of Australia
Film distributors of Italy
Film distributors of France
Film distributors of the Netherlands
Film distributors of Germany
Film distributors of Malaysia
Film distributors of South Korea
Film distributors of Japan
Film distributors of the United States
Film distributors of Canada
Mass media companies established in 1981
Joint ventures
Universal Pictures subsidiaries
Paramount Pictures
NBCUniversal
Paramount Global subsidiaries